Michael Ray Hurlbut (born July 10, 1966) is an American former professional ice hockey defenseman. He was drafted by the New York Rangers in the 1988 NHL Supplemental Draft. He currently serves as the associate head coach of the St. Lawrence University Men's Hockey program.

Playing career

Collegiate
In 1985, he joined the St. Lawrence University Skating Saints Division I Men's Ice Hockey Program. He was recruited from the Northwood School in Lake Placid, New York. While Hurlbut was at St. Lawrence, he was a First Team All-American, as well as a First Team All ECAC. He is widely considered to be one of the best defensemen to ever play hockey for St. Lawrence.

Professional
Hurlbut played in 23 games for the Rangers during the 1992–93 season before parting ways with the franchise.  He would play one game for the Quebec Nordiques during the 1993–94 season, and five more for the Buffalo Sabres near the end of the decade.  The majority of his professional career was spent in the American Hockey League and International Hockey League.  He retired after the 2001–02 season with the Rochester Americans, where he was the longest serving captain in franchise history. During his 14-year professional hockey career, he played in a total of 839 professional games, scored 117 goals, had 364 assists, and was a  team captain in eight of his 14 pro seasons.

Coaching career
In 2002, he returned to his  Alma Mater,  St. Lawrence University to be an assistant coach on a volunteer basis under Joe Marsh. In 2008, he was hired by the university, and became a full-time assistant coach. He was then elevated to associate head coach prior to the 2011–12 season.

Career statistics

Awards and honors

References

External links

1966 births
Living people
Binghamton Rangers players
Buffalo Sabres players
Cornwall Aces players
Denver Rangers players
Houston Aeros (1994–2013) players
Ice hockey players from New York (state)
National Hockey League supplemental draft picks
New York Rangers draft picks
New York Rangers players
People from Massena, New York
Quebec Nordiques players
Rochester Americans players
St. Lawrence Saints men's ice hockey players
San Diego Gulls (IHL) players
American men's ice hockey defensemen
AHCA Division I men's ice hockey All-Americans